Aankhen is a 2002 Indian Hindi-language heist thriller film directed by Vipul Amrutlal Shah, starring Amitabh Bachchan, Akshay Kumar, Arjun Rampal, Sushmita Sen and Paresh Rawal in the lead roles. Aditya Pancholi plays a naive cop. Akshay Kumar appeared in visually impaired role who uses his sixth sense and it was second movie where he played this type of role before that he had played same role in the 1994 film Jai Kishen. The film is an adaptation of Shah's own Gujarati play Andhalo Pato (Blindman's Buff). The producers wanted to name the film as "Aankh Micholi" but the title was registered with another producer.

The film tells the story of Vijay Singh Rajput (Bachchan) a hard-working but temperamental man, who has spent all his life working for one bank and even achieving them International recognition. When Vijay loses his mind and goes on a violent rampage beating up another employee, he is subsequently fired. He decides to take vengeance by organising a full on heist, and having the same bank robbed by three blind men, as no one will suspect them.

Aankhen had its worldwide premiere in Malaysia at the 3rd IIFA Awards ceremony on 5 April 2002. Upon release Aankhen received acclaim from critics and cinema-goers alike, for its unusual storyline, well executed direction and acting, with Bachchan and Akshay Kumar drawing maximum accolades for their performances. The film was nominated in several award categories in 2002/03, although it didn't win any.

While shooting for the film Namastey London the director Vipul Shah learnt that his film Aankhen was the second highest grosser film in the year 2002.

Plot 
Obsessive, temperamental and schizophrenic bank manager Vijay Singh Rajput (Amitabh Bachchan) loses his job for badly beating up a bank clerk who tried to embezzle money. Enraged at losing his job, he plots revenge on the bank by intending to stage a heist. He employs three blind men – Vishwas (Akshay Kumar), a person who after becoming blind in an accident, gains a powerful sixth sense, Illyaas (Paresh Rawal) and Arjun (Arjun Rampal) — when, after passing by school for the blind, he understands that blind people can be trained to do things like sighted people. He blackmails and enlists the help of Neha (Sushmita Sen) who is a teacher at the school to train the trio to do the seemingly impossible heist. He chooses blind people because they, as thieves, would never be suspected as no one would believe blind people can rob a bank.

The bank robbery is successful, with the jewels safely captured by the three. However, in the process of robbing the bank, Illyaas' face is exposed by a nearby civilian, captured in footage and prompting citywide posters with his face. Meanwhile, Mr. Rajput anxiously tries to extort information from Vishwas and Arjun regarding the jewels and their location. Unable to answer, as they did not collect the items, they try to defer the answer by changing subjects. Ultimately, it is revealed that Illyaas is the one with complete knowledge of the box's belongings. Meanwhile, tensions rise between Rajput and Neha; the latter resists the abusive nature of Rajput and his obnoxious harassing of Vishwas and Arjun. Arjun confesses his love to Neha, who reveals that she is associated in the plot only for the well-being of her younger brother, Rahul, who has been kidnapped by Rajput, and she cannot kill him even if she has any weapon in her hand.

In a furious attempt, the police try to locate Illyaas. Illyaas lands up at Rajput's place after getting drunk. Rajput tries several ways to force Illyaas into revealing the location of the box. Unable to generate an answer, he slams Illyaas, who falls on the ground and injures his eyes, causing bleeding. Even in this scenario, Rajput tries to get the information, but Vishwas and Arjun resist and claim that they will reveal the location if Illyaas is treated by paramedics. Rajput sends them to get Dr. Siddiqui. When both go to shamim street to get Dr. Siddiqui, Vishwas senses that Illyaas is in danger and Arjun and Vishwas double back to the training center to save him. Rajput starts to harass Illyaas by tickling him to force him to reveal the answer. In the action, Illyaas falls off the balcony and dies. Unable to bear the shock of the death, Neha pulls a gun on Rajput and threatens to reveal everything to the police if he does not leave her and the other two alone. Rajput notifies Neha that all these acts were done under her training, and he is spotless, and that until Neha is alive, nothing can happen to him. Realizing that she has to die in order to save Arjun and Vishwas, Neha shoots herself, just as both of them return after hearing loud screams.

Both men gang up on Rajput and try to attack him. Once Rajput realises that only Illyaas knew where the jewellery was, he starts shooting them and tries to kill them. The police arrive, and confusion ensues. Vishwas and Arjun come out and claim that Rajput is abusing them while he claims that there is a big conspiracy involving the two people, Neha and Illyaas. Unable to believe that blind men can ransack a bank and amidst Rajput's impassioned defence, the police start getting suspicious. In the heat of defending himself, Rajput reveals that he had sent over Illyaas, thus confessing his crime.

In the end, Rajput has been locked away. Vishwas and Arjun decide to take care of Rahul and ultimately find the jewels – they were hidden in Illyaas' harmonium.

Alternate ending 
In an alternate ending for overseas viewers Rajput bribes the cop (Aditya Pancholi) and is set free, in return to get him his share and gets his manager Bhandari (Ajit Vachani) arrested. Vishwas and Arjun are sitting in a train (waiting for it to depart) and Rajput is standing on the platform with a smile on his face. He then warns them that "A dangerous game is about to begin", after which Vishwas and Arjun both draw their guns, and the film ends.

Cast 
 Amitabh Bachchan as Vijay Singh Rajput
 Akshay Kumar as Vishwas Prajapati
 Arjun Rampal as Arjun Verma
 Sushmita Sen as Neha Srivastav
 Aditya Pancholi as ACP Thakur 
 Paresh Rawal as Illyaas
 Arun Bali as Mr. Goenka
 Ajit Vachani as Mr. Bandari
 Bipasha Basu as Naina (Cameo)
 Malvika Singh as Delnaz
 Shreyas Talpade as Mushtaq (Chaiwallah / Tea seller on railway station)
 Paresh Ganatra as Sailesh
 Daya Shankar Pandey as Taxi Driver
 Smith Seth as Rahul Srivastav, Neha's brother 
 Kashmera Shah in a special appearance in song "Chalka Chalka"

Production 
The film's working title was "All The Best" but was later changed for numerology reasons and to better suit Indian audiences. Originally Raveena Tandon was cast for the role of Neha, but she was unexpectedly dropped and replaced by Sushmita Sen. Sen in turn made a lot of preparations for her role as a teacher to the blind. She visited schools for the blind and interacted with the students for a more-realistic feel to her role. Akshaye Khanna was the original choice for the role played by Arjun Rampal but things didn't work out after Akshaye Khanna rejected Saif Ali Khan was approached to play the role but he was busy with Kal Ho Naa Ho.

Vipul Shah once tickled his nephew to such an extent that he became breathless. This gave Vipul Shah an idea to tickle uncontrollably the character-Iliyas so that his life could be lost.

Reception 

Aankhen opened well at the Indian box office. The film made Rs 471.9 million net altogether and was declared a "Hit". It was also the second-highest-grossing Bollywood film of 2002. The film was also a success in South Africa, opening to packed houses and grossing $14,600 on the weekend, despite a limited release.

Soundtrack 
The soundtrack was composed by Aadesh Shrivastav and Jatin–Lalit. Lyrics were penned by Prasoon Joshi, Praveen Bharadwaj and Nitin Raikwar.

Track listing

Accolades 
48th Filmfare Awards:

9th Annual Screen Awards:

Controversy 
Aankhen broiled into controversy when producer Doshi did not give the director Shah any credit on the film's DVD. The fallout began between the two on the sets, after a number of creative differences, which led to allegations of plagiarism and counter-allegations. The DVD's front cover had Doshi's name on it and the back had the director's name as Vipul Doshi instead of Vipul Shah. Shah took legal action against Doshi, who refused to take responsibility for the director's missing credit.

Copycat crimes 
Between 2004/05, two bank robberies occurred on Mira Road in Maharashtra by a man named Feroz Sheikh and several accomplices, who were said to have been inspired by the film. The robbers took several lakh rupees (100,000), and planned to use it to start a business. The culprits were eventually nabbed but not all the money was recovered.

PC Game 
A computer game based on film was created for promotional purposes in a tie in with IndiaFM and Hungama.com (Now collectively known as Bollywood Hungama). It was launched at the IIFA press conference on 14 March 2002.

Sequel 
The sequel was first announced in 2006 and has been in production since shortly after the release on Aankhen. The director Shah was dropped due to differences with producer Doshi, and directing duties will be taken over by Sachin. On 19 March 2016 in an interview with Anees Bazmee about his film "No Entry Mein Entry", Anees stated that he is working on a script for "Aankhen 2". In March 2019 Bazmee confirmed that the cast for the film has been finalized. Saif Ali Khan and Jacqueline Fernandez are roped in to play the leads apart from Amitabh Bachchan.

References

External links 
 

2000s Hindi-language films
2002 films
Indian heist films
Films about bank robbery
Films scored by Aadesh Shrivastava
Films scored by Jatin–Lalit
Indian thriller films
Indian films based on plays
Films about blind people in India
Films directed by Vipul Amrutlal Shah
Hindi-language thriller films
2000s heist films
2002 thriller films